Bryce Alexander Fisher (born May 12, 1977) is a former American football defensive lineman. He was drafted by the Buffalo Bills in the 7th round of the 1999 NFL Draft. He played college football at Air Force.

High school years
Fisher attended Seattle Preparatory School and was a three-year letterman in football. At Prep he played for head coach Rollie Robbins and defensive coordinator Mitch Robbins. As a senior, he was an All-League selection and was named the League's Lineman of the Year.

College career
Fisher played college football at the United States Air Force Academy in Colorado Springs where he was a two-year starter on defensive line at the Air Force Academy. Selected as WAC Defensive Player of the Year in Mountain Division as senior. Started 12 games and recorded career-high 70 tackles, six sacks, and one fumble recovery. Started 12 games as junior he totaled 63 tackles, 1.5 sacks, one forced fumble, and one fumble recovery. He played in seven games as backup defensive lineman in his sophomore season.

Professional career

Pre-draft

Buffalo Bills
Fisher was drafted in the  seventh-round (248th overall) in the 1999 NFL Draft by the Buffalo Bills. He joined the Bills in 2001 after fulfilling two-year commitment to the Air Force. In 2001, he played in 13 games with two starts for the Bills, and  finished the season with 33 tackles and three sacks.

St. Louis Rams
On September 4, 2002, the St. Louis Rams claimed Fisher off waivers from the Buffalo Bills. In 2002 Fisher saw action in four games on defense and special teams, completing the season with 11 tackles and three quarterback pressures on defense and one special teams tackle.  In 2003, he played in all 16 games, starting
one at left defensive end and made career-high 47 tackles with two tackles for loss, two sacks, one  pass defensed, two forced fumbles, and a team and career-high 27 special teams tackles. In 2004, he started 14 of 16
games for the Rams totaling career highs with 77 tackles and 8.5 sacks (which led the team) and posted two forced fumbles,
three passes defensed.

Seattle Seahawks
On March 16, 2005, Fisher agreed to a four-year, $10 million contract with the Seahawks one season after leading St. Louis with 8.5 sacks. Started 15 games for the Seahawks and led the club with career-high 9.0 sacks in 2005. Fisher made 47 tackles, eight passes defensed, and a forced fumble. The next season, 2006, Fisher started all 16 games at left defensive
end and totaled 46 tackles with 4.0 sacks and a fumble recovery.

Tennessee Titans
The Seattle Seahawks traded him to the Tennessee Titans on September 11, 2007, after Fisher had played one game for Seattle. Fisher played 9 games in for the Titans in 2007 and made five tackles and deflected a pass. He was later released on July 23, 2008.

Personal

When not playing football, Fisher is a Major and a public affairs officer in the Illinois Air National Guard. Fisher completed combat survival training in the summer of 1996 and spent two years (1999-00) on active duty with the Air Force. He was at the Air Force Academy in Colorado Springs, CO, in 1999 where he worked as recruiter and coached defensive line for the JV football team. Worked in 2000 as Vehicle Operations Officer at Pope Air Force Base in Fayetteville, N.C. He has three daughters

References

External links

 NFL.com profile
 Defense Link article

1977 births
Living people
Air Force Falcons football players
American football defensive ends
Buffalo Bills players
Seattle Seahawks players
St. Louis Rams players
Tennessee Titans players
Sportspeople from Renton, Washington